PP-81 Sargodha-X is a Constituency of Provincial Assembly of Punjab.

General elections 2013

General elections 2008

See also
 PP-80 Sargodha-IX
 PP-82 Khushab-I

References

External links
 Election commission Pakistan's official website
 Awazoday.com check result

Provincial constituencies of Punjab, Pakistan